Missouri's 25th Senatorial District is one of 34 districts in the Missouri Senate. The district is based in Southeast Missouri and includes all of the counties of Butler, Carter, Dunklin, Mississippi, New Madrid, Pemiscot, Shannon, and Stoddard.

The district is currently represented by Republican Jason Bean.

District Profile
Major cities in the district include Poplar Bluff, Kennett, Dexter, Caruthersville, Malden, and Portageville. The district is home to Three Rivers College.

The district, although anchored in the GOP stronghold of Butler County, is fairly independent. The district takes in most of the Bootheel, one of the most impoverished and African American regions of the state - characteristics that favor Democrats. Although Democrats control most of the local/county offices in the district, both political parties are about as evenly competitive in the district.

Demographics
According to the 2010 U.S. Census:
Population: 169,588
White/Caucasian: 88.66%
Black/African American: 8.03%
Hispanic/Latino: 2.11%
Two or More Races: 1.58%
Some Other Race: 0.92%
Native American: 0.41%
Asian: 0.38%
Pacific Islander: 0.03%

Voting in Statewide Elections

Election results

1996

2000

2004

2008

References

Missouri General Assembly
Missouri State Senate districts